Phanetta is a monotypic genus of North American dwarf spiders containing the single species, Phanetta subterranea. It was first described by Eugen von Keyserling in 1886, and has only been found in the United States.

See also
 List of Linyphiidae species (I–P)

References

Linyphiidae
Monotypic Araneomorphae genera
Spiders of the United States
Taxa named by Eugen von Keyserling